These are the official results of the Women's 100 metres Hurdles event at the 1993 IAAF World Championships in Stuttgart, Germany. There were a total number of 43 participating athletes, with three semi-finals and six qualifying heats and the final held on Friday August 20, 1993.

Medalists

Final

Semi-finals
Held on Thursday 1993-08-19

Qualifying heats
Held on Thursday 1993-08-19

See also
 1988 Women's Olympic 100m Hurdles (Seoul)
 1990 European World Championships 100m Hurdles (Split)
 1991 Women's World Championships 100m Hurdles (Tokyo)
 1992 Women's Olympic 100m Hurdles (Barcelona)
 1994 European World Championships 100m Hurdles (Helsinki)
 1995 Women's World Championships 100m Hurdles (Gothenburg)

References
 Results

H
Sprint hurdles at the World Athletics Championships
1993 in women's athletics